Tristan Lamasine and Franko Škugor were the defending champions but chose not to defend their title.

Bradley Klahn and Jackson Withrow won the title after defeating Hans Hach Verdugo and Vincent Millot 6–2, 6–3 in the final.

Seeds

Draw

References
 Main Draw

Challenger Banque Nationale de Gatineau
Challenger de Gatineau